The St. John's Red Storm is the nickname used for the 17 varsity athletic programs of St. John's University, in the U.S. state of New York. St. John's 17 NCAA Division I teams compete in the Big East Conference, with the exception of the fencing team, which compete in the ECAC. On December 15, 2012, St. John's and the other six Catholic, non-FBS schools (the so-called "Catholic 7") announced that they were departing the former Big East for a new conference. The "Catholic 7", after purchasing the "Big East" name from the FBS schools and adding Butler, Creighton, and Xavier, began operating as the new Big East Conference beginning in July 2013.

The athletic program fields sixteen intercollegiate teams: basketball, soccer, baseball, lacrosse, tennis, golf, and fencing for men and basketball, soccer, softball, volleyball, tennis, track and field, cross country, golf, and fencing for women. In 2002, the university eliminated five men's athletic teams and one women's team in order to comply with Title IX rules prohibiting activities that receive federal assistance from discriminating on the basis of gender.

Prior to the 1994–95 school year, the university's nickname was the St. John's Redmen, which referenced the red uniforms worn by its teams in competition. The name was interpreted as a Native American reference in the 1960s, and the university did have a mascot (adorned in Native American dress), which eventually led to the team's name change to the Red Storm.  The change happened at a time when there was mounting pressure on colleges and universities to adopt names more sensitive to Native American culture. The Redmen name still remains popular among fans, however, as does "Johnnies".  On September 18, 2009, the new mascot, which was voted on by students, was revealed; Johnny Thunderbird.

Teams

Baseball

Head Coach: Mike Hampton
Stadium: Jack Kaiser Stadium
All-Americans: 21 (Frank Viola 1981, Tony Bonura 1986, Eric Reichenbach 1991, C.J. Nitkowski 1994, Mike Dzurilla 1998, Mike Dzurilla 1999, Mike Rozema 2003, Craig Hansen 2005, Anthony Varvaro 2005, Will Vogl 2006, George Brown 2008, Tim Morris 2009, Jeremy Baltz 2010, Joe Panik 2011, Jeremy Baltz 2012, Matt Wessinger 2012, Ryan McCormick 2015, Thomas Hackimer 2015, Thomas Hackimer 2016, Sean Mooney 2017, Sean Mooney 2018)
Big East Championships: 18 (Tournament: 1985, 1986, 1988, 1993, 1997, 2010, 2012, 2015, 2018; Regular Season: 1987, 1991, 1992, 2005, 2007, 2008, 2012, 2015, 2018)
College World Series appearances: 6 (1949, 1960, 1966, 1968, 1978, 1980)
The St. John's baseball team, currently coached by Mike Hampton, has been to the College World Series six times, recorded 34 NCAA appearances, 8 Big East Championships and have sent 70 players on to professional baseball careers.  The team plays at the 3,500-seat Jack Kaiser Stadium, dedicated in 2007 to the Hall of Fame Coach and former St. John's Athletic Director.  The stadium is one of the largest college baseball stadiums in the northeast, and is a featured venue on the EA Sports MVP NCAA Baseball video game. The stadium was conceived out of a deal between the university and the Giuliani administration.  The administration wanted to find a location for a single-A team that would be affiliated with the New York Mets. Expressing concern about quality of life issues and the spending of public money for a private religious institution, surrounding neighborhood civic groups and local politicians protested the plan.  In order to placate their concerns, however, the Mets offered to open it up to the communities for local high school games and youth programs. This stadium was built despite large protests by community residents as well as State Senator Frank Padavan (while also using city financing) The Red Storm played the first ever game at the Mets' new ballpark, Citi Field on March 29, 2009.

Basketball

Men's Basketball

Head Coach: Mike Anderson
Arena: Carnesecca Arena and Madison Square Garden
Big East Championships: 7 (Tournament: 1983, 1986, 2000; Regular Season: 1980, 1983, 1985, 1986, 1992)
NCAA Appearances: 29 (1951, 1952, 1961, 1967, 1968, 1969, 1973, 1976, 1977, 1978, 1979, 1980, 1982, 1983, 1984, 1985, 1986, 1987, 1988, 1990, 1991, 1992, 1993, 1998, 1999, 2000, 2011, 2015, 2019)
Final Four Appearances: 2 (1952, 1985)
National Players of the Year: 2 (Chris Mullin 1984–85, Walter Berry 1985–86)
St. John's is the seventh most winningest program in college basketball history (1,686 wins),  St. John's boasts the 7th-most NCAA tournament appearances (27), two Wooden Award winners as national player of the year, 11 consensus All-Americans, 6 members of the College Basketball Hall of Fame, and has sent 59 players to the NBA. However, St. John's currently holds the NCAA Division I record for most NCAA Men's Division I Basketball Championship appearances without a championship. The Red Storm play most of their home games at Madison Square Garden, "The World's Most Famous Arena", while their early non-conference games are held at Carnesecca Arena on the St. John's campus in Queens. St. John's University holds the second best winning percentage for a New York City school in the NCAA basketball tournament (second to City College of New York - which won the 1950 NCAA Division I Championship). St. John's has the most NIT appearances with 27, the most championship wins with 6, although they were stripped of one due to an NCAA infraction. The 1910–11 St. John's team finished the season with a 14–0 record and was retroactively named the national champion by the Helms Athletic Foundation and the Premo-Porretta Power Poll. In 2008, St. John's celebrated its 100th year of college basketball.

On February 21, 2011, the men's basketball team was voted into the top 25 in the AP and ESPN Coaches poll. This was the first time the team had been ranked since the end of the season in 2000.

The basketball team is the most popular collegiate basketball program in New York City and has a world-wide following. There are numerous fan forums that support the basketball program, in addition to all of the university's teams. The most popular is redmen.com which often leads the mainstream sports media in breaking news regarding its sports teams.

Women's Basketball

Head Coach: Joe Tartamella
Arena: Carnesecca Arena
Big East Championships: 6 (Tournament: 1983, 1984, 1988, 2016; Regular Season: 1983, 1985)
NCAA Appearances: 10 (1983, 1984, 1988, 2006, 2010, 2011, 2012, 2013, 2014, 2016)
The women's basketball team is currently coached by Joe Tartamella, who became the program's seventh head coach in 2012. Since then the team has competed in six postseason tournaments in his seven-year tenure and won one Big East tournament title. The program's highest postseason finish came during the 2011–12 season when they advanced to Sweet Sixteen under Kim Barnes Arico lead by WNBA Draft picks, Nadirah McKenith and Shenneika Smith.

Since then the program has had two additional WNBA selections, in Aliyyah Handford and Danaejah Grant, who helped add a fourth Big East tournament championship in 2016.

Fencing
Head Coach: Yury Gelman
National Championships: 1 (2001)
Individual National Championships: 22

The St. John's fencing program has also attained national prominence under US Fencing Hall of Fame and five-time Olympic saber coach Yury Gelman. In 2001, St. John's won the NCAA Fencing Championship. The team has ranked in the top five each of the last 10 years, and finished second in the NCAA during 1995, 2000, 2002, 2007 and 2010 seasons. In addition to team accolades, St. John's has won 22 NCAA individual national championship titles. Israeli Olympian Tomer Or is a coach of the team.

Notable former fencers:
Keeth Smart (born 1978), 3x USA Olympic fencer (Sydney '00, Athens '04, Beijing '08)
Jonathan Tiomkin (born 1979), USA Olympic fencer (Athens '04)
Arlene Stevens (born 1981), USA Olympic fencer (Sydney '00)
Daryl Homer (born 1990), 2x USA Olympic fencer (London '12, Rio '16)
Ivan Lee (born 1981), USA Olympic fencer (Athens '04)
 Eli Schenkel (born 1992), Canadian Olympic fencer
Dagmara Wozniak (born 1988), 3x USA Olympic fencer (Beijing '08, London '12, Rio '16)

Golf
The men's golf team have won 10 Big East conference titles: 1979, 1981–84, 1986–89, 2014. The men's team also had three players finish in first place at the annual Big East Championship: Andrew Svoboda in 2001, Ryan McCormick in 2014, and Dylan Crowley in 2015.

The women's golf team won the first and only Big East team championship in 2005 and two individual championships in 2011 and 2014.

Notable former golfers:
Andrew Svoboda (Class of 2003), PGA Tour professional golfer
Keegan Bradley (Class of 2008), PGA Tour professional golfer
Mike Ballo, Jr. (Class of 2010), Web.com Tour professional golfer

Soccer

Men's soccer

Head Coach: David Masur
Stadium: Belson Stadium
Big East Championships: 15 (Tournament: 1992, 1993, 1994, 1995, 1998, 2001, 2006, 2009, 2011; Regular Season: 1992, 1993, 1996, 1997, 2003, 2008)
College Cup Appearances: 4 (1996, 2001, 2003, 2008)
National Championships: 1 (1996)
St. John's won the 1996 NCAA Men's Division I Soccer Championship, made four appearances in the NCAA College Cup (1996, 2001, 2003 and 2008) and reached sixteen NCAA post-season tournaments, including fifteen straight from 1992 to 2006. The Red Storm also reached ten consecutive NCAA Tournament Rounds of sixteen from 1996 to 2005. Under Coach Masur, the Red Storm have also won seven Big East tournament titles, six regular season crowns and has qualified for eighteen consecutive Big East tournaments. Their home games are hosted at Belson Stadium, a state of the art 2,168-seat stadium on the university campus, which sells out often. In 2006, the men's soccer team became the first American soccer team to be invited to play in Vietnam. The team played against several Vietnam Football Federation squads as well as participating in community service.

Women's soccer
Head Coach: Ian Stone
Stadium: Belson Stadium
Big East Championships: 2 (Tournament: 1994; Regular Season: 2015)
NCAA Appearances: 4 (2009, 2013, 2015, 2021)
The St. John's program have been members of the Big East since the conference started sponsoring women's soccer in 1994, and winning the conference's inaugural tournament. The Red Storm have competed in four NCAA Division I Women's Soccer Championships with a record of 2-2-1 with their two wins coming in 2013 against Central Florida before falling to Arkansas in the second round, and their second 1–0 over Brown in extra time in the first round in 2021. They were led by two-time NSCAA All-American Rachel Daly who went on to break many university scoring records and being selected in the 2016 NWSL College Draft by the Houston Dash with the sixth overall pick.

Softball
Head Coach: Bob Guerriero
Stadium: Red Storm Field
Big East Championships: 4 (Regular Season: 2015, 2017, 2019; Tournament: 2015)
NCAA Appearances: 1 (2015)

Tennis
The men's tennis team has won 6 Big East conference titles: 1980, 1991, 2014–2016, 2019.

The women's tennis team won their first and only Big East conference championship in 2018.

Volleyball
Head Coach: Joanne Persico
Arena: Carnesecca Arena
Big East Championships: 5 (Tournament: 2007, 2019; Regular Season: 2006, 2007, 2008)
NCAA Appearances: 3 (2006, 2007, 2019)

Football

St. John's discontinued its varsity football team in 2002.

Championships

NCAA team championships
St. John's has won two NCAA team national championships.

Men's (1)
Soccer (1): 1996
Co-ed (1)
Fencing (1): 2001
see also:
Big East Conference NCAA team championships
List of NCAA schools with the most NCAA Division I championships

Mascot
In spring 2009, St. John's allowed its students to vote on what the new official Red Storm mascot would be. At a soccer game in fall 2009, members of the Athletics Department announced that a Thunderbird had received the majority of votes and would become the new mascot. After a vote, the new mascot was named Johnny Thunderbird. He can be seen at many of the school's athletic events, cheering on the Red Storm.

St. John's Athletics Hall of Fame
In 1984, St. John's established an athletics hall of fame with 10 charter members representing a cross-section of the school's athletic history.

Notable athletes
Ron Artest (now Metta Sandiford-Artest) (born 1979), NBA basketball player
Rich Aurilia (born 1971), MLB professional baseball player
Erick Barkley, former NBA basketball player
Walter Berry, NBA basketball player
Keegan Bradley, PGA Tour golfer and 2011 PGA Major Championship winner
Danny Burawa (born 1988), major league baseball pitcher.
Lou Carnesecca, Hall of Fame basketball coach
Omar Cook, former NBA basketball player
Rachel Daly, professional soccer player in the NWSL and the England women's national football team
Mike Francesa, popular sports radio talk show host for WFAN in the New York City metro area.
John Franco, former baseball player who was captain for the New York Mets
Bill Gaudette, MLS professional soccer player
Matt Groenwald, MLS professional soccer player
Zendon Hamilton, U.S. professional basketball player in Europe, former NBA player
Craig Hansen, MLB professional baseball player
Maurice Harkless (born 1993), NBA basketball player
Darryl Hill, basketball player known as "Showtime Hill"
Mark Jackson, NBA basketball player and head coach
Shalrie Joseph, MLS professional soccer player
D. J. Kennedy, former NBA basketball player
Brian Kenny, MLB Network sportscaster
John Kresse, NCAA men's basketball coach at the College of Charleston
Al McGuire, NCAA men's basketball coach and sports commentator
Dick McGuire, NBA Player with Pistons and Knicks and NBA Coach with Pistons and Knicks
Frank McGuire, NCAA Men's basketball coach at St. John's, North and South Carolina and NBA coach for the Philadelphia Warriors
Stefani Miglioranzi, MLS professional soccer player for Philadelphia Union, played in England for Swindon Town
Chris Mullin, 1984 John R. Wooden Award Recipient, 1984 Olympic gold medal winner, 1992 Olympic gold medal winner, NBA Player (1985-2001), 5-Time NBA All Star (1989-1993), 2010 Naismith Basketball Hall of Fame Inductee (as part of the Dream Team), 2011 Naismith Basketball Hall of Fame Inductee (individually)
Joe Panik, professional baseball player, 2011 first-round draft pick of the San Francisco Giants
Brent Sancho, MLS professional soccer player
Malik Sealy, NBA basketball player (now deceased)
Bob Sheppard, stadium PA announcer for the New York Yankees and New York Giants, famously dubbed "Voice of the Yankees” (now deceased).
Keeth Smart, Olympic fencer, first U.S. fencer to reach #1 world ranking
Frank Viola, professional baseball player
Bill Wennington, Canadian NBA basketball player and author
Jayson Williams, NBA basketball player and author
Chris Wingert, MLS professional soccer player
Mel Davis, European professional basketball player, current Director of Basketball Alumni Development for St. John's University
Thomas Michaelsen, Former Professional Lacrosse Player

References

External links